Tunkhannock Historic District is a national historic district located at Tunkhannock, Wyoming County, Pennsylvania. It encompasses 225 contributing buildings in the central business district and surrounding residential areas of Tunkhannock.  The district includes residential, commercial, and institutional buildings constructed between 1841 and 1954, in a variety of popular architectural styles including Queen Anne and Italianate. Notable buildings include the Bolles-Bardwell-Tewksbury Building (c. 1842), Prince Hotel (1844), Phelps Building (1844-1845), Dietrich Theater (1925), former Masonic Hall (c. 1876), Stark Block (late 1850s), Wyoming County Courthouse (1843, 1870), Palen-Ervine House (1868), Piatt-Ogden House (1896), Presbyterian Church of Tunkhannock (1891), and First United Methodist Church (1934).

It was added to the National Register of Historic Places in 2005.

References

Historic districts on the National Register of Historic Places in Pennsylvania
Queen Anne architecture in Pennsylvania
Italianate architecture in Pennsylvania
Historic districts in Westmoreland County, Pennsylvania
National Register of Historic Places in Westmoreland County, Pennsylvania